Oriolo is a surname. Notable people with the surname include:

Don Oriolo, American artist, musician, and writer
Giuseppe Oriolo (1681–1750), Italian painter
Joe Oriolo (1913–1985), American cartoon animator, writer, director, and producer